Phos is a genus of sea snails, marine gastropod mollusks in the family Nassariidae.

Taxonomy 
This genus was treated within family Buccinidae. It was moved to family Nassariidae in 2016.

Species
Species within the genus Phos include:

 † Phos acuminatus (K. Martin, 1879) 
 Phos alabastrum Fraussen, 2003
 Phos armillatus (Fraussen & Poppe, 2005)
 Phos blainvillei Deshayes in Bélanger, 1832
 Phos borneensis G. B. Sowerby II, 1859
 Phos boucheti Fraussen, 2003
 Phos brigitteae (Stahlschmidt & Fraussen, 2009)
 † Phos bruneiensis Harzhauser, Raven & Landau, 2018 
 Phos crassus Hinds, 1843
  † Phos cuspidatus (K. Martin, 1879)
 Phos cyanostoma (A. Adams, 1850)
 Phos dedonderi (Fraussen & Poppe, 2005)
 Phos deforgesi Fraussen, 2003
 Phos deprinsi (Fraussen & Poppe, 2005)
 Phos dumalis (Philippi, 1851)
 Phos durianoides (Fraussen & Poppe, 2005)
 Phos elegantissimus Hayashi & Habe, 1965
 † Phos estotiensis Lesport & Lozouet, 2021 
 Phos fasciatus A. Adams, 1854
 Phos ganii Fraussen, Galindo & Rosado, 2020
 Phos geminus Fraussen, Galindo & Rosado, 2020
 Phos gemmulifer Kilburn, 2000
 Phos gladysiae Melvill & Standen, 1901
 Phos hastilis (Fraussen & Poppe, 2005)
 Phos hayashii Shikama, 1977
 Phos hirasei G. B. Sowerby III, 1913
 Phos idyllium (Fraussen & Poppe, 2005)
 Phos intactus (Fraussen & Poppe, 2005)
 Phos ladoboides Fraussen, Galindo & Rosado, 2020
 Phos laevis Kuroda & Habe in Habe, 1961
 Phos liui (S.-Q. Zhang & S.-P. Zhang, 2014)
 Phos lucubratonis (Fraussen & Poppe, 2005)
 Phos makiyamai Kuroda, 1961
 Phos miculus (Fraussen & Poppe, 2005)
 Phos minutus Schepman, 1911
 Phos monsecourorum (Fraussen & Poppe, 2005)
 Phos muriculatus  Gould in G.B. Sowerby, 1859
 Phos nigroliratus Habe, 1961
 Phos nitens G. B. Sowerby III, 1901
 Phos nodicostatus A. Adams, 1851
 Phos opimus (Fraussen & Poppe, 2005)
 Phos pulchritudus Fraussen, Galindo & Rosado, 2020
 Phos pyladeum Kato, 1995
 Phos retecosus Hinds, 1844
 † Phos roseatus Hinds, 1844
 Phos roycei M. Smith, 1938 
 Phos rufocinctus A. Adams, 1851
 Phos scitamentus (Fraussen & Poppe, 2005)
 Phos sculptilis Watson, 1886
 Phos senticosus (Linnaeus, 1758) 
 Phos temperatus Fraussen & Poppe, 2005
 Phos testaceus Fraussen, Galindo & Rosado, 2020
 Phos textilis A. Adams, 1851
 Phos textus (Gmelin, 1791)
 † Phos thayerae M. Smith, 1936 
 Phos tsokobuntodis (Fraussen & Poppe, 2005)
 Phos usquamaris (Fraussen, 2005)
 Phos vandenberghi Fraussen & Poppe, 2005
 Phos varicosus Gould, 1849
 Phos verbinneni (Fraussen, 2009)
 Phos virgatus Hinds, 1844
 † Phos woodwardianus K. Martin, 1884 

Taxa inquirenda
 Phos adamsi Petit de la Saussaye, 1853 
 Phos plicatus A. Adams, 1859 
 Phos scalarioides A. Adams, 1851

Species brought into synonymy
 Phos adelus Schwengel, 1942: synonym of Parviphos adelus (Schwengel, 1942); synonym of Antillophos adelus (Schwengel, 1942) (original combination)
 Phos articulatus Hinds, 1844: synonym of Metaphos articulatus (Hinds, 1844)
 Phos bathyketes Watson, 1882 : synonym of Antillophos bathyketes (Watson, 1882) 
 Phos chazaliei Dautzenberg, 1900: synonym of Antillophos chazaliei (Dautzenberg, 1900)
 Phos cumingii Reeve, 1846: synonym of Strombinophos cumingii (Reeve, 1846)
 Phos elegans Guppy, 1866: synonym of Antillophos elegans (Guppy, 1866)
 Phos elegantissimus Hayashi & Habe, 1965 : synonym of Antillophos elegantissimum (Hayashi & Habe, 1965) 
 Phos gaudens Hinds, 1844: synonym of Metaphos gaudens (Hinds, 1844)
 Phos grateloupianus (Petit, 1853): synonym of  Antillophos grateloupianus (Petit de la Saussaye, 1853) 
 Phos hirasei Sowerby, 1913 : synonym of Antillophos hirasei (G.B. Sowerby, 1913) 
 Phos laeve Kuroda & Habe in Habe, 1961 : synonym of Antillophos laeve (Kuroda & Habe in Habe, 1961) 
 Phos laevis Kuroda & Habe in Habe, 1961: synonym of Antillophos laevis (Kuroda & Habe in Habe, 1961)
 Phos makiyamai Kuroda, 1961 : synonym of Antillophos makiyamai (Kuroda, 1961) 
 Phos minutus Schepman, 1911 : synonym of Antillophos minutus (Schepman, 1911) 
 Phos naucratoros Watson, 1882 : synonym of Antillophos naucratoros (Watson, 1882) 
 Phos nigroliratus Habe, 1961 : synonym of Antillophos nigroliratum (Habe, 1961) 
 Phos nitens G. B. Sowerby III, 1901: synonym of Antillophos nitens (G. B. Sowerby III, 1901)
 Phos plicosus (Dunker, 1846): synonym of Nassarius speciosus (A. Adams, 1852)
 Phos pyladeum Kato, 1995 : synonym of Antillophos pyladeum (Kato, 1994) 
 Phos retecosus Hinds, 1844 : synonym of Antillophos retecosus (Hinds, 1844)
 Phos spinicostatus A. Adams, 1851: synonym of Phos blainvillei Deshayes in Bélanger, 1832
 Phos textilus [sic]: synonym of Phos textilis A. Adams, 1851
 Phos unicinctus (Say, 1826): synonym of Engoniophos unicinctus (Say, 1826)
 Phos varians Sowerby, 1866: synonym of Phos textus (Gmelin, 1791)
 Phos varicosus Gould, 1849: synonym of Antillophos varicosus (Gould, 1849)
 Phos veraguensis Hinds, 1843: synonym of Antillophos veraguensis (Hinds, 1843)

References

External links

Nassariidae